The Daimler-Benz DB 602, originally known as Daimler-Benz LOF.6, was a German diesel cycle aero engine designed and built in the early 1930s. It was a liquid-cooled upright V16, and powered the two Hindenburg-class airships. It has roughly the same displacement and weight of the Beardmore Tornado, which was used in the ill-fated R101, but has almost twice the power of the Tornado, showing Daimler-Benz's superior knowledge regarding diesel engine construction. 

Also, these engines, under designation MB 502, powered four Schnellboots of 1933 series S10...13 (three engines on each). The engine was modified into V20 MB 501 of 2000 hp that had a variety of applications.

Applications
 LZ 129 Hindenburg
 LZ 130 Graf Zeppelin II
 Schnellboot 1933 series S10...13

Engines on display
A preserved Daimler-Benz DB 602 is on display at the Zeppelin Museum Friedrichshafen.

Specifications (DB 602)

See also

References

Notes

Bibliography

 Neil Gregor Daimler-Benz in the Third Reich. Yale University Press, 1998

External links

Aircraft diesel engines
Daimler-Benz aircraft engines
1930s aircraft piston engines
Airship engines